The 1995–96 Macedonian Football Cup was the 4th season of Macedonia's football knockout competition. FK Vardar were the defending champions, having won their second title. The 1995–96 champions were FK Sloga Jugomagnat who won their first title.

Competition calendar

Source:

First round

Matches were played on 13 August 1995.

|}

Source:

Second round

The first legs were played on 8 November and second were played on 7 December 1995.

|}

Source:

Quarter-finals
The first legs were played on 3 March and second were played on 20 March 1996.

|}

Sources:

Semi-finals
The first legs were played on 17 April and the second were played on 1 May 1996.

|}

Sources:

Final

See also
1995–96 Macedonian First Football League
1995–96 Macedonian Second Football League

References

External links
 1995–96 Macedonian Football Cup at rsssf.org

Macedonia
Cup
Macedonian Football Cup seasons